Stephen Hale Marsh was born in the United Kingdom and lived in other countries, including Japan, but thirty productive years of his career were spent in Australia. He gave popular lectures on music. He was fondly regarded as a pioneer of music. He taught singing in Sydney, where he was said to raise the expectations of the audience. Although he was initially an ally of fellow composer Isaac Nathan, he later became a rival.

Marsh took part in the inauguration of the Victorian Academy of Music. Marsh wore his beard in the chin-strap style. He played and wrote music for the harp.

Works
 1824 There's a magic in thine eye, love 
 1841 Leichhardt's Return
 1845 Australian Waltz
 1846 Leichhardt's march
 1851 Ferrolana Polka Opus 63
 1854 'By Murray's Banks' - setting of bush poem by 'Ignotus' or 'Evelyn' 
 1854 Liechhardt March
 1854 Bathurst March 
 1855 Brilliant fantasia 
1856 Far O'er the Sea 
 1856 Allan McGan 
 1859 In Thee Oh Lord Do I Put My Trust
 1862 (arrangeur) 'Le Bon Voyage' 
 1865 'The Stockman's last bed' setting of lines published as early as 1857 
1872 Illustrations of Pipelӗ 
Advance Australia
Fair Australia Waltzes
 Hail to Victoria! Queen of the ocean
Australian Polka
Gentleman in Black (Opera)
1896 (posthumous) Song of the Aeroplane: The Flying Machine 
Japan Waltz
Churan Waltz
Homebush Galop

Recordings
All England Eleven Polka

References

 

Australian classical harpists
1808 births
1888 deaths
Australian conductors (music)
Australian male composers
19th-century Australian musicians
19th-century classical composers
Australian male classical composers
Australian opera composers
Musicians from Melbourne
19th-century conductors (music)
Male opera composers